Bala Joneyd-e Lakpol (also Romanized as Bālā Joneyd-e Lākpol) is a village in Balatajan Rural District, in the Central District of Qaem Shahr County, Mazandaran Province, Iran. At the 2006 census, its population was 1,688, in 455 families.

References 

Populated places in Qaem Shahr County